Picrorrhyncha is a genus of moths in the Carposinidae family.

Species
Picrorrhyncha atribasis Diakonoff, 1950
Picrorrhyncha pista Diakonoff, 1973
Picrorrhyncha scaphula Meyrick, 1922

References

Natural History Museum Lepidoptera generic names catalog

Carposinidae
Moth genera